The 1974 TAA Formula Ford Driver to Europe Series was an Australian motor racing competition open to Formula Ford racing cars. It was the fifth annual Australian national series for Formula Fords.

The series was won by Terry Perkins, driving an Elfin 620FF and a Titan.

Schedule
The series was contested over ten rounds with one race per round.

Series standings

References

TAA Formula Ford Driver to Europe Series
Australian Formula Ford Series